Stelis ancistra is a species of orchid plant native to Colombia, Ecuador.

References 

ancistra
Flora of Colombia
Flora of Ecuador